This is a list of notable criminal gangs in Los Angeles, California.

The County and the City of Los Angeles has been nicknamed the "Gang Capital of America," with an estimated 450 active gangs with a combined membership of more than 45,000.

Gangs

Abergil Crime Family
Avenue Kings Familia
Bahala Na Gang
Black Guerrilla Family
Bloods
Black P. Stones
Bounty Hunter Bloods
Pirus
Inglewood Family Bloods
Crips
8Trey Gangster Crips
Asian Boyz
Grape Street Watts Crips
30 Strong Santa Monica
Rollin 60's Neighborhood Crips
Sons of Samoa
Tongan Crip Gang
Venice Shoreline Crips
Compton Executioners
Lynwood Vikings
Los Angeles crime family
Peckerwood
Aryan Brotherhood
Nazi Lowriders
Public Enemy No. 1
Satanas
Sarzana
Sinaloa Cartel
Mexican Mafia
Sureños
18th Street gang
38th Street gang
The Avenues
Armenian Power
South Los 13
Azusa 13
Barriox13
Barrio Mojados
Culver City Boys 13
El Monte Flores 13
Florencia 13
East Side Ghetto Family 13
Logan Heights Gang
MS-13
BlueDevilMafia13
OVS
Playboys
Puente 13
Santa Monica 13
Temple Street
Toonerville Rifa 13
Varrio Nuevo Estrada
Venice 13
Vineland Boys Gang
Westside Locos 13
White Fence
Tiny Rascal Gang
Triad
14K Triad
Bamboo Union
Big Circle Gang
Black Dragons
Four Seas Gang
Wah Ching
Wo Hop To
Yakuza
 South Gate Brotherss SGB13

See also

 List of gangs in the United States
 List of LASD deputy gangs

References

Further reading 
Chang, Cindy. "Crips make peace on the softball field." Los Angeles Times, 31 Dec. 2017, https://www.latimes.com/local/lanow/la-me-crips-softball-20171231-htmlstory.html. Accessed 11 Apr. 2019.

Los Angeles-related lists
Lists of organizations based in the United States
California law-related lists
Gangs in Los Angeles
Los Angeles